Light of Dawn is the second and final album by the hard rock/power metal band Unisonic. It was released on 1 August 2014, with cover art credited to Martin Häusler.

Dennis Ward stated about the album title & artwork: "The song Throne of the Dawn was originally titled Light of the Dawn but the lyrics became another concept during songwriting. However, we still felt strongly about the title and thought that it fit very well to the artwork. Every day has its dawn, a new beginning, a fresh start".

The majority of the songs were written by Dennis Ward, with further input from Michael Kiske and Mandy Meyer. A music video was filmed for the song "Exceptional".

The album entered several international music charts, scoring the highest entries on the Finnish albums chart, German albums chart, Swiss albums chart, Czech albums chart and Japanese albums chart.

Track listing

Personnel
 Michael Kiske - lead vocals
 Kai Hansen - lead & rhythm guitars, backing vocals
 Mandy Meyer - lead & rhythm guitars
 Dennis Ward - bass, backing vocals, producer, engineer, mixing
 Kosta Zafiriou - drums, percussion

Guest session musician
 Günter Werno - keyboards

Charts

References

External links
 Unisonic official website
 EarMusic official website

2014 albums
Albums produced by Dennis Ward (musician)